Titan Towers is an office building located in Stamford, Connecticut, United States. It serves as a global headquarters for the American professional wrestling promotion, World Wrestling Entertainment, Inc. (WWE). While the interior is not accessible to the general public, WWE fans and visitors frequently visit or view the exterior of Titan Towers on a regular basis.

Overview
Built in 1989, the  building consists of four stories of office space and four levels of parking. The building was opened on May 13, 1991. Though the building originally had only one flagpole with the United States flag, it later housed a second flag that featured the company's logo on a black background. The main exterior logo has also changed over the years. Prior to the construction of the Titan Towers, the offices of Titan Sports, Inc., the parent company of the World Wrestling Federation (WWF), were headquartered in Holly Hill Lane in nearby Greenwich, Connecticut then moved to 1055 Summer Street just 2 km away in 1985.

On September 7, 1995, the rooftop of Titan Towers was used for one of the scenes of the opening intro of WWF Monday Night Raw. This scene featured Yokozuna, The Undertaker, Razor Ramon, and several other wrestlers.

In 1999, Titan Towers was featured in a 30-second television commercial that consisted of Stone Cold Steve Austin, Sable, The Rock, Kane, The Undertaker, Mankind, Chyna, and Vince McMahon during Super Bowl XXXIII. That same year, on the June 14 edition of Raw is War, Austin took a kayfabe role as CEO overseeing day-to-day operations within the WWF.

During the August 21, 2006, episode of Raw, D-Generation X defaced Titan Towers by tagging the "DX" logo on the building with green spray paint.

In the build-up to Extreme Rules in 2013, Brock Lesnar and Paul Heyman visited Titan Towers on May 13 in which they vandalized Triple H's office and attacked nearby employees of WWE.

On March 20, 2019, the company announced they will sell Titan Towers, and relocate their headquarters to 707 Washington Boulevard in Stamford, Connecticut by 2021. Though the moved was later delayed to late 2022. Starting in March 2023, the company is in the process of moving to its new headquarters, located 3.4 km west of the current location, which will be completed by early 2024.

During the COVID-19 pandemic, Titan Towers began to be used as an alternative location for selected matches during pay-per-views (as opposed to the WWE Performance Center); WrestleMania 36's "Firefly Fun House" match between Bray Wyatt and John Cena was filmed at Titan Towers using props and set pieces in storage. The two eponymous ladder matches at Money in the Bank were also filmed on its premises, with the participants fighting their way to a ring on its rooftop to locate the Money in the Bank briefcases.

According to Jim Cornette, Vince McMahon's office, as well as those in charge of creative, are on one side of the building, while Linda McMahon's office, as well as those in charge of corporate, are on the other

References
 

WWE
1981 establishments in Connecticut
Office buildings completed in 1981
International style architecture in Connecticut
Mass media company headquarters in the United States